Whiskey Run Township is one of nine townships in Crawford County, Indiana. As of the 2010 census, its population was 1,911 and it contained 881 housing units.

Geography

Cities and towns
 Milltown (west half)

Unincorporated towns
 Hogtown
 Idlewild (extinct)
 Wynnsboro (extinct)

Adjacent townships
 Posey Township, Washington County (northeast)
 Blue River Township, Harrison County (east)
 Spencer Township, Harrison County (southeast)
 Jennings Township (southwest)
 Sterling Township (west)
 Liberty Township (northwest)
 Southeast Township, Orange County (northwest)

Major highways
  Indiana State Road 64
  Indiana State Road 66

Cemeteries
The township contains four cemeteries: Saint Josephs, Union Chapel, Milltown Community and Totten.

References
 United States Census Bureau cartographic boundary files
 U.S. Board on Geographic Names

External links

 Indiana Township Association
 United Township Association of Indiana

Townships in Crawford County, Indiana
Townships in Indiana